Jonathan Arthur Waterhouse (born 11 April 1965) is a former English cricketer.  Waterhouse was a right-handed batsman.  He was born in Leek, Staffordshire.

Waterhouse made his debut for Staffordshire in the 1985 Minor Counties Championship against Northumberland.  Waterhouse played Minor counties cricket for Staffordshire from 1985 to 1997, which included 52 Minor Counties Championship matches and 4 MCCA Knockout Trophy matches.  In 1988, he made his List A debut against Surrey in the NatWest Trophy.  He played 2 further List A matches for Staffordshire, against Hampshire in the 1993 NatWest Trophy and Derbyshire in the 1996 NatWest Trophy.  In his 3 matches, he scored 76 runs at an average of 25.33.  He made a single half century, which came against Surrey, with Waterhouse making 52.

References

External links
Jonathan Waterhouse at ESPNcricinfo
Jonathan Waterhouse at CricketArchive

1965 births
Living people
Sportspeople from Leek, Staffordshire
English cricketers
Staffordshire cricketers